The 1964 Pittsburgh Panthers football team represented the University of Pittsburgh in the 1964 NCAA University Division football season.  The team compiled a 3–5–2 record under head coach John Michelosen. The team's statistical leaders included Fred Mazurek with 686 passing yards and Barry McKnight with 551 rushing yards.

Schedule

References

Pittsburgh
Pittsburgh Panthers football seasons
Pittsburgh Panthers football